Timothy Hill (born February 10, 1990) is an American professional baseball pitcher for the San Diego Padres of Major League Baseball (MLB). He previously played for the Kansas City Royals.

Amateur career
Hill attended Granada Hills Charter High School in Los Angeles, California. Undrafted out of high school, Hill attended Palomar College his freshman year. He then moved on to Bacone College. Hill was drafted by the Kansas City Royals in the 32nd round of the 2014 Major League Baseball draft.

Professional career

Kansas City Royals
Hill signed and spent 2014 with both the Idaho Falls Chukars and Lexington Legends, posting a combined 3–1 win–loss record and 1.64 earned run average (ERA) in 22 innings pitched. He missed all of 2015 while undergoing treatment for stage 3 Colon cancer. In 2016, he played for the Wilmington Blue Rocks and Northwest Arkansas Naturals, compiling a combined 2–4 record and 3.43 ERA with 62 strikeouts in 63 total innings pitched between both teams, and in 2017, he once again played for both Wilmington and Northwest Arkansas, going 1–2 with a 4.26 ERA in 40 total games between the two clubs. The Royals added him to their 40-man roster after the 2017 season.

Hill made the 25-man roster for the 2018 Royals, and had his MLB debut on Opening Day, March 29, pitching  of an inning in relief against the Chicago White Sox; he hit the first batter he faced, Leury García. He finished the 2018 season going 1–4 with a 4.53 ERA over  innings. Hill produced a 2–0 record with a 3.61 ERA over  innings for the Royals in 2019.

San Diego Padres
On July 16, 2020, Hill was traded to the San Diego Padres in exchange for Franchy Cordero and Ronald Bolaños. In the pandemic shortened 2020 season, Hill pitched to a 3-0 record and 4.50 ERA with 20 strikeouts and 6 walks in 18 innings across 23 appearances for the Padres.

On January 13, 2023, Hill agreed to a one-year, $1.85 million contract with the Padres, avoiding salary arbitration.

Personal life
Hill's father died of colon cancer in 2006. Hill was diagnosed with colon cancer during spring training of 2015. Half of his colon was removed and he underwent eight months of chemotherapy, before being cleared by his doctor in January 2016. Hill also has Lynch syndrome.

References

External links

1990 births
Living people
People from Sylmar, Los Angeles
Baseball players from California
Major League Baseball pitchers
Kansas City Royals players
San Diego Padres players
Palomar Comets baseball players
Bacone Warriors baseball players
Idaho Falls Chukars players
Lexington Legends players
Wilmington Blue Rocks players
Northwest Arkansas Naturals players
Tigres del Licey players
American expatriate baseball players in the Dominican Republic
Omaha Storm Chasers players
Granada Hills Charter High School alumni